Jill Nichole McCabe Petersson (born 5 September 1962) is a former Swedish female athlete who also represented Sweden in the 1984 Summer Olympics. Jill McCabe competed at the 800m and 1500m events during the  1984 Olympics.

References

External links 

1962 births
Living people
Swedish female middle-distance runners
Olympic athletes of Sweden
Athletes (track and field) at the 1984 Summer Olympics